The 2020 Ohio Senate election was held on November 3, 2020, with the primary election held on April 28, 2020. Ohio voters elected state senators in the 16 even-numbered Ohio Senate districts. State senators elected in 2020 will be eligible to serve a four-year term beginning January 2021 and ending December 2024. These elections coincided with elections for U.S. President and the Ohio House.

Although Democrats had hoped to break the Republican supermajority in the chamber (which would have required them to pick up three seats), they ended up losing one, further consolidating Republican control.

Predictions

Statewide results

Close races 
Seats where the margin of victory was under 10%:
  
  (gain)

Results by district

Overview 

|}

Detailed results

District 2 


Primary results

General election results

District 4

Primary results

General election results

District 6

Primary results

General election results

District 8

Primary results

General election results

District 10

Primary Results

General Election Results

District 12

Primary Results

General Election Results 

79.3

District 14

Primary Results

General Election Results

District 16

Primary Results

General Election Results

District 18

Primary Results

General Election Results

District 20

Primary Results

General Election Results

District 22

Primary Results

General Election Results

District 24

Primary Results

General Election Results

District 26

Primary Results

General Election Results

District 28

Primary Results

General Election Results

District 30

Primary Results

General Election Results

District 32

Primary Results

General Election Results

See also
 2020 Ohio elections

Notes

References

External links
  (State affiliate of the U.S. League of Women Voters)

 
 
 

Ohio Senate
2020 Ohio elections
Politics of Ohio
Ohio Senate elections